Farson is a census-designated place (CDP) in Sweetwater County, Wyoming, United States. The population was 313 at the 2010 census.

Geography and climate
Farson is located at  (42.171927, -109.420096).

According to the United States Census Bureau, the CDP has a total area of 77.8 square miles (201.4 km2), of which 75.4 square miles (195.4 km2) of land and 2.3 square miles (6.1 km2) (3.02%) is water.

Farson lies at the intersection of U.S. 191 and Wyoming Highway 28 (the South Pass Highway). It is 40 miles north of Rock Springs and approximately 45 miles southwest of South Pass.

Climate

According to the Köppen Climate Classification system, Farson has a cold semi-arid climate, abbreviated "BSk" on climate maps.

Demographics
As of the census of 2000, there were 242 people, 96 households, and 69 families residing in the CDP. The population density was 3.2 people per square mile (1.2/km2). There were 118 housing units at an average density of 1.6/sq mi (0.6/km2). The racial makeup of the CDP was 96.28% White, 0.83% African American, 1.65% from other races, and 1.24% from two or more races. Hispanic or Latino of any race were 5.37% of the population.

There were 96 households, out of which 30.2% had children under the age of 18 living with them, 64.6% were married couples living together, 5.2% had a female householder with no husband present, and 28.1% were non-families. 26.0% of all households were made up of individuals, and 9.4% had someone living alone who was 65 years of age or older. The average household size was 2.52 and the average family size was 3.01.

In the CDP, the population was spread out, with 23.6% under the age of 18, 8.7% from 18 to 24, 25.2% from 25 to 44, 31.8% from 45 to 64, and 10.7% who were 65 years of age or older.  The median age was 40 years. For every 100 females, there were 103.4 males. For every 100 females age 18 and over, there were 110.2 males.

The median income for a household in the CDP was $44,545, and the median income for a family was $56,806. Males had a median income of $41,364 versus $21,250 for females. The per capita income for the CDP was $16,140. None of the population or families were below the poverty line.

Education
Public education in the community of Farson is provided by Sweetwater County School District #1. Farson-Eden School, a K-12 campus, serves the community.  The majority of the students enrolled reside in either Farson or Eden; however, there is a bus that transports students from nearby Rock Springs.

Farson has a public library, a branch of the Sweetwater County Library System.

References

External Link 

 farson

Census-designated places in Sweetwater County, Wyoming
Census-designated places in Wyoming